My Best Friend is a 2001 Greek comedy film directed by Yorgos Lanthimos and Lakis Lazopoulos. It is Lanthimos' feature directorial debut.

Cast 
 Lakis Lazopoulos – Konstadinos
 Antonis Kafetzopoulos – Alekos
 Vera Krouska – Dafni
 Smaragda Karydi – Andrea

Box office 
The film was a commercial success, selling 350,000 admissions in Greece. In Cyprus, it sold 7,914 admissions.

References

External links 

2001 comedy films
2001 films
Films directed by Yorgos Lanthimos
Greek comedy films
2000s Greek-language films